Skyhawks was a 17-episode television cartoon series sponsored by Mattel Toys. Each half-hour episode consisted of two adventures. The series originally aired from September 6, 1969 to September 4, 1971 on ABC. It was a Pantomime Picture Production and is distributed by CBS Television Distribution.

Plot
Skyhawks, Inc. was a family-run air transport and rescue service based at San Marcos Field in Southern California, and headed by widower Mike "Cap" Wilson. Cap Wilson learned how to fly during World War II, during which he achieved the rank of Colonel. Cap's father, famed aviator Pappy Wilson, had been a World War I flying ace. A warm and encouraging father, Cap had 17-year-old fraternal twins named Steve and Carolyn. He also sponsored two foster kids: 14-year-old Baron "Red" Hughes and his 9-year-old sister Cynthia, usually referred to as "Cindy", though she was also nicknamed "Mugs". The Wilson crew also included Cap's girlfriend. Maggie McNally. Joe Conway was the Skyhawks' chief mechanic. The team saved troubled charter planes, rescued helicopter pilots, transported air freight, even ran secret government missions. San Marcos Field also was the home base of the Skyhawks' unscrupulous competitor, Buck Devlin, and his gang of pilots.

Production
A 17-episode television cartoon series sponsored by Mattel Toys, Skyhawks was produced by Ken Snyder at Pantomime Pictures. Each episode consisted of two adventures. The series aired on ABC from September 6, 1969 to September 4, 1971.

Topper Toys alleged that this show and its sister series Hot Wheels were merely 30-minute commercial ads for Mattel.

Cast (voices)

 Captain Mike Wilson—Michael Rye
 Steve Wilson—Casey Kasem
 Caroline Wilson—Iris Rainer
 Pappy Wilson—Dick Curtis
 Maggie McNalley—Joan Gerber
 Baron "Red" Hughes—Dick Curtis
 Cynthia Hughes—Melinda Casey
 Joe Conway—Casey Kasem
 Buck Devlin—Bob Arbogast

Episodes
There were 17 episodes, comprised two adventures each.  At the end of each episode a short extra gave information on piloting and flying.

 "Night Flight"/"Flight to Danger (Big Wet Bird)"
 "Untamed Wildcat"/"Silent Flight"
 "The Search"/"Mission to Avalanche Wells"
 "Lobster Pirates"/"The Message"
 "Hidden Valley"/"The Snooper"
 "Bams Away"/"Vacation with Danger"
 "The Radioactive Lake"/"Circus Trail"
 "The Sniffers"/"Hot Wire on Storm Mountain"
 "Fire in the Tree"/"Runaway Ride"
 "The Duster"/"Animal Airline"
 "Discover Flying"/"Pappy to the Rescue"
 "The Intruders"/"Trouble Times Three"
 "Operation Slingshot"/"Dog Fight"
 "Quick Frozen"/"All at Sea"
 "Ground Zero"/"Devlin's Dilemma"
 "Barnstormer's Circus"/"The Peril of the Prince"
 "Carrier Pigeon"/"Mercy Flight"

References

External links

 

1960s American animated television series
1969 American television series debuts
1970s American animated television series
1971 American television series endings
American Broadcasting Company original programming
American children's animated adventure television series
Animated television series about children
Aviation television series
English-language television shows
Television series by CBS Studios
Television series by Mattel Creations